The Nemacheilidae, or stone loaches, are a family of cypriniform fishes that inhabit stream environments, mostly in Eurasia, with one genus, Afronemacheilus found in Africa. The family includes about 790 species.

Genera 
The following are the described genera of the family:

References

 
Taxa named by Charles Tate Regan